The Big Hangover is a 1950 American comedy film released by MGM. The film starred Van Johnson and Elizabeth Taylor and was written and directed by Norman Krasna. Supporting players include Percy Waram, Fay Holden, Leon Ames, Edgar Buchanan, Selena Royle, Gene Lockhart, and Rosemary DeCamp.

The Big Hangover was one of Elizabeth Taylor's first films to feature her in an "adult character" role, the first being the 1949 British thriller Conspirator.

Despite being released with high hopes, The Big Hangover was a critical and box office disappointment. Home video releases are scarce in any format, as the movie remains largely unknown.

Plot
Law school student David Maldon is hired by a prominent law firm. At a birthday party for the senior partner, John Belney, his erratic behavior causes Belney's beautiful daughter, Mary, to accuse David of being drunk.

He is not. David suffers from a rare malady, "liquor recoil", causing him to become intoxicated at the mere taste of alcohol. He hallucinates during these episodes, and Mary, a psychoanalyst, is fascinated at the way David even imagines a talking dog.

City attorney Carl Bellcap is threatening a lawsuit against the firm over the eviction of a Chinese family from their apartment. David intervenes, saving the day, but firm partner Charles Parkford had been responsible for the eviction and is now livid. Parkford slips wine into David's soup, then enjoys watching the younger man make a public spectacle of himself.

At law school graduation, David surprises his colleagues by submitting his resignation, deciding to work instead for Bellcap and the city. Mary hates to see him leave the family firm, but respects David's values and has also fallen in love.

Cast
 Van Johnson as David Maldon
 Elizabeth Taylor as Mary Belney
 Percy Waram as John Belney
 Fay Holden as Martha Belney
 Leon Ames as Carl Bellcap
 Edgar Buchanan as Uncle Fred Mahoney
 Selena Royle as Kate Mahoney
 Gene Lockhart as Charles Parkford
 Rosemary DeCamp as Claire Bellcap
 Philip Ahn as Dr. Lee
 Gordon Richards as Williams
 Matt Moore as Mr. Rumlie
 Pierre Watkin as Samuel C. Lang
 Russell Hicks as Steve Hughes

Production
Krasna sold his story to MGM in March 1949 for what he said was more than $100,000.

In July June Allyson was announced for the lead with Montgomery Clift wanted to play her co star. By the end of the month however Van Johnson and Elizabeth Taylor were set as stars.

The film was also known as  Drink to Me Only.

Reception

Box Office
According to MGM records the film made $1,320,000 in the US and Canada and $306,000 overseas, leading to a profit of $25,000.

References

External links
 
 
The Big Hangover at TCMDB
Review of film at Variety

1950 films
1950 comedy films
American black-and-white films
American comedy films
Films scored by Adolph Deutsch
Films directed by Norman Krasna
Metro-Goldwyn-Mayer films
1950s English-language films
1950s American films